Knut-Olaf Haustein (20 September 1934 – 10 February 2006) was a German physician best known for his work studying the effects of tobacco smoking.

References

Haustein K-O (2002). Tobacco or Health? Physiological and Social Damages Caused by Tobacco Smoking Springer, 
Knut-Olaf Haustein curriculum vitae (in German)

1934 births
2006 deaths
German pulmonologists